Constantine Keroularios was a high-ranking Byzantine official in the third quarter of the 11th century.

Life 
Constantine was a nephew of the powerful Michael Keroularios, Patriarch of Constantinople in 1043–1059. The name of his father is unknown. A friend and correspondent of Michael Psellos, Constantine and his brother Nikephoros were among the supporters of Isaac I Komnenos when he rose in revolt to seize the throne in 1057, and went on to occupy senior offices in the Byzantine hierarchy. In his correspondence with Psellos, Constantine is variously referred to by the high court ranks of sebastos, proedros, protoproedros, and magistros, the senior fiscal offices of sakellarios and genikos logothetes, and the judicial offices of epi ton kriseon and droungarios tes viglas. It was probably under Constantine's tenure that the latter office acquired the epithet "megas" ("grand"), and was confirmed as the Empire's senior-most judicial authority. Constantine was apparently also the first person to hold the title of sebastos. A seal which may be attributable to him further records the titles of "vestarches, judge of the Velum, and grand curator of the Mangana".

Constantine was also a cousin of Eudokia Makrembolitissa, who married Isaac's lieutenant and successor as emperor, Constantine X Doukas, as she too is referred to as a niece of the patriarch. In 1067, Constantine X was dying. Eudokia, as empress-dowager and mother of Constantine's under-age sons, would lead the regency, but Constantine X feared that she might well include her relatives, who already held high posts in court, in the regency, thus posing a potential threat to the succession of Constantine X's own children. He therefore had Eudokia swear publicly that she would not remarry nor appoint any co-regents over her under-age sons with Constantine other than the latter's brother John Doukas, an oath that she would soon break, however, with her marriage to Romanos IV Diogenes.

Constantine Keroularios died sometime under Nikephoros III Botaneiates (ruled 1078–1081), as his will was the subject of an investigation at this time.

Family 
According to genealogy of the 12th-century writer John Tzetzes, Constantine Keroularios married a Georgian lady, a relative of the empress Maria of Alania. The couple had a daughter, who was eventually adopted by Eudokia Makrembolitissa. She married a tax official named George, and gave birth to Tzetzes' own mother. Constantine had also several sons, of whom Michael Keroularios was the most prominent: he likewise became megas droungarios tes viglas and married into the Komnenos dynasty, but defrauded his other brothers of their father's inheritance.

References

Sources 
 
 
 
 
 
 
 

11th-century deaths
11th-century Byzantine people
Byzantine officials
Constantine
Year of birth unknown
Magistroi
Vestarchai
Sebastoi